Unakkaga Ellam Unakkaga is a 1999 Indian Tamil-language romantic comedy film written and directed by Sundar C., starring Karthik and Rambha with Goundamani, Vivek, Vinu Chakravarthy, Anju among others in supporting roles. The film, scored by Yuvan Shankar Raja and filmed by U. K. Senthil Kumar, was released on 24 September 1999. It was a blockbuster hit on release. It was Karthik's last film release before the new 2000s millennium. The film was remade in Telugu as Maa Pelliki Randi (2001). The film also saw Karthik and Rambha sharing the screen together for the second time after Ullathai Allitha (1996).

Plot 
Sakthivel is the only son of a rich landlord in a village. He roams around with his uncle Kundalagesi without taking any responsibilities, which irritates his father. One day, Sakthi meets Indhu in his village, and it is love at first sight for him. He meets her on a few more instances and proposes his love. Though reluctant at first, Indhu falls for Sakthi.

Sakthi's father meets his close friend after so many years, and they decide to get their children married to each other. Sakthi gets furious hearing this and requests his father to stop the wedding plans, for which he does not agree. As Sakthi is scared of his father, he is unable to convey about his love.

Sakthi formulates a plan along with Kundalakesi and his friend Madhi. They plan to create a problem when their families meet so the wedding will be cancelled. On the day of the meeting, Sakthi and his sidekicks try so many things to disturb the gathering, but all goes in vain.

Finally Sakthi falsely accuses that the bride's family members speak ill about his family, which brings about a heated argument. In between the argument, Sakthi hits the bride's father to blow up the problem, but is shocked to see Indhu over there dressed up as the bride. Only then Sakthi realises that the bride is none other than Indhu, and feels bad that he has spoiled the event.

Indhu is angered seeing Sakthi hit her father, so she ditches him and leaves to Chennai. Sakthi's father is equally angry over his friend believing the false accusation made by Sakthi. Sakthi tries to convince his father and Indhu, but neither of them gets convinced. Sakthi comes to Chennai to meet Indhu and explain to her about the incident. Indhu, though reluctant to meet Sakthi at first, later understands his position and accepts him.

Sakthi saves Latha from committing suicide, and Inspector Kalyanaraman misunderstands them as couples. Also, Madhi is married to a rich, arrogant businesswoman Savithri. Madhi romances with a prostitute (Vichithra), and when Savithri spots them together, he defends them by introducing the prostitute as Sakthi's wife. Another man mistakes Sakthi as his son-in-law.

Finally Sakthi convinces both his father and Indhu's father, and their wedding is arranged. A few hilarious events happen when everyone attends the wedding, misunderstanding Sakthi as a cheat. Everything is sorted out when the girls involved open up the truth to everyone. In the end, Sakthi unites with Indhu.

Cast 

Karthik as Sakthivel
Rambha as Indhu
Goundamani as Kundalagesi
Vinu Chakravarthy as Sakthivel's father
Vivek as Madhi
Anju as Savithri
Indhu as Latha
Jai Ganesh as Indhu's father
Vichithra as Prostitute
Vinodhini as Anjali
Madhan Bob as Inspector Kalyanaraman
S. S. Chandran as wedding guest who thinks Sakthivel is his son-in-law
Hemanth Ravan as Indu's Father's Manager
Vaiyapuri as Gun Pandi
Vichu Vishwanath as Ali Baba
Sachu as Sakthivel's mother
Balu Anand as Indhu's uncle
Crane Manohar
Kaka Radhakrishnan as Sakthivel's Grandfather
Pandu as Doctor
Mumtaj in Special Appearance
Suraj as photographer

Soundtrack 
The soundtrack was composed by Yuvan Shankar Raja, who worked for the first time with Sundar C. The soundtrack, released in 1999, has five tracks with lyrics written by Palani Bharathi, Kalaikumar and Viveka.

Critical reception 
Indolink wrote "The film is hilarious on some occasions, but is also uncomfortably vulgar during others" and also noted "But the film has a little something few films have today! It will make you laugh till your tummy aches, if you are willing to laugh along". D. S. Ramanjuan of The Hindu wrote, "CHAOTIC SITUATIONS and rip-roaring fun, a hallmark of director Sunder C. (the humour content outbeats the director's “Ullathal Alli Thaa”) pervade the frames right through in Lakshmi Movie Makers’, “Unakkaga Ellam Unakkaga”. C. Siraj's fun-filled story and dialogue find good outlet in the screenplay of the director." Aurangazeb of Kalki questioned that while it is good to make comedy films amidst violence filled action films, how can one force someone to laugh when the laughs are hard to come.

References

External links 

1990s Tamil-language films
1999 films
1999 romantic comedy films
Films directed by Sundar C.
Films scored by Yuvan Shankar Raja
Indian romantic comedy films
Tamil films remade in other languages